Eschweilera subcordata is a species of woody plant in the family Lecythidaceae. It is found only in Brazil. It is threatened by habitat loss.

References

subcordata
Flora of Brazil
Taxonomy articles created by Polbot

Critically endangered flora of South America